The Words to Say It is an autobiographical novel by Marie Cardinal, first published in French as Les Mots pour le dire in 1976. The novel deals with Cardinal's childhood in Algeria, her sense of loss on leaving, her relationship with her mother, mental illness, and recovery through psychoanalysis.

References

Further reading
 Dammann, Hiltrud. Marie Cardinals "Les mots pour le dire": Autobiographisches weibliches Schreiben im Kontext der 68er Bewegung, C. Winter, 1994
 
 Hoft-March, Eilene. Cardinal's The Words to Say it: The Words to Reproduce Mother, Studies in 20th Century Literature 21:2 (1997), pp. 4
 Martin, Elaine, 'Mother, Madness, and the Middle Class in The Bell Jar and Les Mots pour le dire''', The French-American Review 5:1 (Spring 1981), pp. 24–47
 Powrie, Phil. 'Reading for Pleasure: Marie Cardinal's Les Mots pour le dire and the Text as (Re)play of Oedipal Configurations', in Margaret Atack and Phil Powrie, eds., Contemporary French Fiction by Women: Feminist Perspectives, Manchester: Manchester University Press, 1990.
 Robson, Kathryn. 'The Hysterical Body in La Souricière and Les Mots pour le dire, in Emma Webb, ed., Marie Cardinal: New Perspectives, Peter Lang, 2005, pp. 93–106
 Wagner, Walter. Les Mots pour le dire ou la dialectique de l'aveu', in Emma Webb, ed., Marie Cardinal: New Perspectives'', Peter Lang, 2005, pp. 171–186

Algerian novels
1976 novels
1976 in Algeria
Autobiographical novels
French-language novels